Alpy may refer to:
Alpı, Ujar, Azerbaijan
Alpy, Pomeranian Voivodeship, Poland
Alps, Alpy in Polish and West Slavic languages